Lille is a city in northern France.

Lille may also refer to:

Places
 Lille, Belgium
 Lille, Alberta, Canada
 Arrondissement of Lille, France
 Lille, Grand Isle, Maine, U.S.

Other uses
 Lille (song), by Lisa Hannigan, 2008
 Lille OSC, a French football club
Lille OSC (women)

See also

Lili (disambiguation)
Lilley (disambiguation)
Lilli (disambiguation)
Lillie (disambiguation)
Lilly (disambiguation)
Lily (disambiguation)